Tom-Jelte Slagter (born 1 July 1989) is a Dutch former professional road racing cyclist, who rode professionally between 2011 and 2020, for the , ,  and  teams.

Career
Born in Groningen, Groningen, Netherlands, Slagter currently resides in Leeuwarden, Friesland, Netherlands.

Rabobank (2011–2013)
Slagter won the third stage after attacking on the finial climb, cresting it alone. He was joined by three riders on the descent, and with the peloton on their heels, Slagter out-sprinted the group. On the fifth stage, he gained the orange jersey; finishing atop Old Willunga Hill in second position, behind Australian Simon Gerrans, the defending champion. On the final stage, Slagter successfully defended his lead, with Spaniard Javier Moreno earning second place, seventeen seconds in arrears.

In August 2013, Slagter signed with the  squad, penning a two-year deal.

Garmin–Sharp (2014–2017)

2014
At Paris–Nice, Slagter won stages 4 and 7. He then went on to finish 2nd in the Spanish one-day race GP Miguel Induráin. His last race before his classics campaign was the Tour of the Basque Country in which he finished 13th. At Liége–Bastogne–Liége he finished 6th, his best result ever in a monument. Before that he also finished 5th in La Flèche Wallonne. Slagter rode the Tour de France, and finished 9th on stage 16 to Bagneres-de-Luchon. After the Tour, he rode the Clásica de San Sebastián. and finished just outside of top 10, in 14th place. He rode the Canadian World Tour classics, Grand Prix Cycliste de Québec, and Grand Prix Cycliste de Montréal, where he finished 11th and 12th respectively.

2015
Slagter's best result during the first part of the 2015 season, was finishing 9th in La Flèche Wallonne. He rode the Tour of Alberta, and won 2 stages during the race. He then rode the Canadian World Tour classics and finished 4th in Québec and 10th in Montréal.

Team Dimension Data (2018–2019)
At the Tour Down Under, Slagter finished 3rd overall, in his first race for the team. His best result during the classics period was 12th at La Flèche Wallonne.

B&B Hotels–Vital Concept (2020)

Major results

2010
 1st  Road race, National Under-23 Road Championships
 1st Stage 2 Circuit des Ardennes
 4th Overall Tour de l'Avenir
 7th Liège–Bastogne–Liège U23
 8th De Vlaamse Pijl
2012
 5th Grand Prix Cycliste de Québec
 6th Overall Tour of Oman
2013
 1st  Overall Tour Down Under
1st  Young rider classification
1st Stage 3
 1st  Mountains classification Tour of Alberta
 7th Grand Prix Cycliste de Québec
 9th Overall Tour de l'Ain
2014
 Paris–Nice
1st Stages 4 & 7
 2nd GP Miguel Induráin
 5th La Flèche Wallonne
 6th Liège–Bastogne–Liège
2015
 3rd Overall Tour of Alberta
1st Stages 3 & 4
 4th Grand Prix Cycliste de Québec
 9th La Flèche Wallonne
 9th GP Miguel Induráin
 10th Grand Prix Cycliste de Montréal
2016
 1st Stage 1 Tour du Haut Var
 4th Tre Valli Varesine
 8th Clásica de San Sebastián
 9th Brabantse Pijl
2017
 1st Stage 2 Tour of Austria
 3rd Grand Prix Cycliste de Montréal
 4th Overall Tour of Alberta
 6th Grand Prix Cycliste de Québec
2018
 3rd Overall Tour Down Under
2019
 6th Grand Prix Cycliste de Québec
 7th Overall Tour de Yorkshire
 8th Overall Deutschland Tour

Grand Tour general classification results timeline

Classics results timeline

References

External links

Cycling Base: Tom-Jelte Slagter
Garmin-Sharp: Tom-Jelte Slagter

1989 births
Living people
Dutch male cyclists
Sportspeople from Groningen (city)
UCI Road World Championships cyclists for the Netherlands
Cyclists from Groningen (province)